The 1982 San Jose Earthquakes season was the ninth for the franchise in the North American Soccer League.  They finished fifth in
the Western Division.

Squad
The 1982 squad

Competitions

NASL

Match results

Season 

* = ShootoutSource:

Standings

References

External links
The Year in American Soccer – 1982 | NASL
San Jose Earthquakes Game Results | Soccerstats.us
San Jose Earthquakes Rosters | nasljerseys.com

San Jose Earthquakes seasons
San Jose Earthquakes
San Jose Earthquakes
San Jose Earthquakes